Samuel Davies Weakley, Jr. (July 16, 1860 – February 14, 1921) was chief justice of the Supreme Court of Alabama from April 18, 1906 to November 8, 1907, having been appointed by Governor William D. Jelks to complete the term of the deceased Chief Justice Thomas N. McClellan.

Born in Morgan County, Alabama, Weakley attended a prep school in Florence, Alabama, graduating from Florence State Normal School in 1879.

Weakley taught school in Lauderdale County, Alabama for a few months while reading law, in order to be admitted to the Alabama Bar in 1880. He then relocated to Memphis, Tennessee and entered legal practice.

References

Justices of the Supreme Court of Alabama
1860 births
1921 deaths
U.S. state supreme court judges admitted to the practice of law by reading law
Chief Justices of the Supreme Court of Alabama